BtoB Blue is the first official sub-unit of South Korean boy band BtoB formed under Cube Entertainment in 2016. The sub-group consists of the group's vocal line Eunkwang, Changsub, Hyunsik and Sungjae. The sub-unit debuted with their digital single titled "Stand By Me" on September 19, 2016.

History

Predebut
Prior to their debut as a subgroup, the group had performed on several singing competitions. In 2014, the group appeared on Mnet The Singer Game with the theme of 'A song you want to hear when you want to curse at your boss' to the 100-member judges of stressed office workers, and sang Urban Zakapa's "I Hate You" (니가 싫어), but lost during the first round with 69 to 31.

In 2016, the group appeared on Immortal Songs: Singing the Legend singing "To My Love" (님에게). The group has captivated the audience with its overwhelming performance and quirky charm and emotional performance that shows off their vocal skills. Their vocal performance received a warm reception by the audience, describing "sweet voice, beautiful harmony, and rich sensibility." The senior singers who saw the quartet group's stage gave admiration and praised it, saying, "The harmony was perfect, and the four people sang in harmony with each other's colours." The quartet scored 427 points, defeating Hong Ji-min, Homme, Second Moon and Lim Do-hyeok, winning 4 consecutive wins and won the championship.

2016–present: Debut and "When It Rains"
On September 12, 2016, a picture captioned, "Coming soon! 2016.09.19. 00:00(KST)." were posted to BtoB's Twitter account that formed an image of BtoB members crowded around a director's camera, staring intently into the monitor. Following that, Cube Entertainment announced that they will debut BtoB's first unit, BtoB Blue with digital single "Stand By Me". The song is produced by Black Eyed Pilseung who previously worked on hit songs for Sistar, Twice and more. "Stand By Me" is described as a ballad featuring their matured and sorrowful voices. BtoB member Peniel directly participated in the music video production. Immediately after the release, the song charted on several Korean music charts, Monkey 3 ranked 1st, Melon ranked 3rd and Mnet ranked 2nd. On September 24, they performed for the first time on MBC's Show! Music Core stage.

On July 8, 2017, BtoB Blue performed The Blue's "Under the Sky" (하늘 아래서) on KBS' program Immortal Songs 2. Although the group lost to Homme, the original singer Kim Min-jong of The Blue commented, "I was really impressed with their singing, beautiful melody, thank you." and Son Ji-chang said, "It was a time that seemed to be a great strength for me to live in the future."

Discography

Singles

Music videos

Filmography

Variety shows

Awards and nominations

References

Musical groups established in 2016
2016 establishments in South Korea
Musical groups from Seoul
South Korean contemporary R&B musical groups
K-pop music groups
South Korean boy bands
Cube Entertainment artists
BtoB (band)